The 1965 Estonian SSR Football Championship was won by Baltic Fleet Tallinn.

League table

References

Estonian Football Championship
Est
Football